This article outlines the history and types of passenger rolling stock and guards vans on the narrow-gauge lines of the Victorian Railways in Australia. The types were constructed in parallel with very similar designs.

All passenger carriages operating under the Victorian Railways were painted a deep red, with black underframes and white lettering. In the early preservation era, vehicles managed by the Puffing Billy Preservation Society had a yellow band painted across the side, indicating the change in responsibility, although this practice slowly fell out of favour in the Emerald Tourist Railway Board era with few (if any) carriages now carrying this indication.

Victorian Railways stock

NBB and NBDBD (saloon pairs)

When the Wangaratta to Whitfield line opened in March 1889, it was provided with two American-style second-class bogie saloon vehicles coded BB, and two bogie composite passenger car/brakevans coded BDBD. This could have led to confusion in official correspondence, so the codes painted on the carriages were amended with an N prefix in front of the carriage numbers before they entered service, i.e. N2BDBD.

The carriages were designed to operate in pairs. The saloon carriage featured open end platforms longitudinal benches, initially divided into two  internal compartments with a dividing bulkhead and doorway. The shortest bench, seating two, was opposite the ladies' lavatory and was two windows long. The remainder of the carriage had inward-facing longitudinal bench seating for 22 passengers. The main saloon was subsequently divided by a partition and sliding door to provide a smoking compartment holding eight passengers at the opposite end to the ladies' compartment, whilst the central saloon seated 14 passengers.

The composite carriage had a single saloon area fully enclosed and fitted with seating for seven passengers. The composite van's passenger area was unofficially reserved for gentlemen, with smoking permitted and access to the male lavatory area between the passenger and guard areas. Passengers could only access the gentlemen's saloon through the guard compartment, or via the end-of-carriage doorways included at both ends of the NBBD vans which were designed to link to the saloon car's end platforms when coupled. Passengers were also permitted to walk through the train via the guards compartment if under supervision.

The NBDBD van area was designed with a workspace, capacity for up to four tons of goods or luggage, and a booking office compartment obviating the need for on-platform ticket sales staff.

To avoid the need to reverse the two carriages at each end of every run, the NBB cars were permitted to trail behind the NBDBD vans on each train with the guard working from the van area, but walking to the rear of the NBB when required.

An additional vehicle of each type was constructed in 1900 for the line to Gembrook, followed by two more of each in 1901. 4NBDBD and 4NBB functioned as spare vehicles, replacing those which had been transported to Newport Workshops for maintenance, while 5NBB and 5NBDBD were held in storage until the Beech Forest line opened in 1902. 1904 saw the sixth NBB enter service at Wangaratta, and in 1905, the sixth NBDBD at Moe for the then-under-construction line to Walhalla.

In 1910 the codes were changed from NBDBD to NBC and NBB to NB respectively. At the same time, a seventh NBC carriage was constructed, entering service near the end of 1910 on the newly-opened Walhalla line.

The pattern vehicles were built at Newport Workshops, while 2NBDBD/2NBB and 3NBDBD/3NBB were constructed by private work gangs. All other vehicles were then constructed at Newport Workshops directly by the railways.

By 1914, both 3NB and 5NB were fitted with a vertical hand brake on one of the end platforms. This allowed their use as a trailing vehicle on a train if no guards van was available.

Automatic couplers were fitted in lieu of the original Chopper style progressively between 1926 and 1928.

4 and 5NBC were scrapped in 1938, 3 and 6 in 1951 and 7 in 1954. 1NBC had been sold in 1954 and transferred to a private property in Colac, from which it was recovered in 1995. 2NBC had been condemned in 1954 but, like much of the Puffing Billy rolling stock, it was restored for use on that line.

3NB was erroneously recorded as scrapped in 1928, but later recorded in the workshops in 1931, and was stored at Wangaratta following cessation of passenger services on the line from there to Whitfield. It was recommended for scrapping in December 1937, and this took place in March the following year, along with 4NB. 6NB was sold privately along with compartment car 8NB, and these were recovered by the Puffing Billy Preservation Society from Ocean Grove in the 2000s. 1, 2 and 5NB were retained in service until 1950, when the bodies were transferred to Pakenham for use as staff accommodation during the Gippsland line electrification project. They were officially recorded as scrapped at Newport Workshops in February 1951, but in 1959 all three bodies were purchased by the Puffing Billy Preservation Society and transported by road from Pakenham to Menzies Creek.

Puffing Billy Railway currently has 2NBC, 1NB, 2NBD (formerly 2NB but with guard's compartment fitted) and 5NBD (formerly 5NB but as guard's van and catering car) available for service, along with 1NBC, 6NBC and 6NB awaiting restoration.

NABAB, NBB and NDD (compartment style)

After a few years of operation the design of passenger stock on the narrow gauge changed. Instead of coupled pairs of saloon carriages, miniature versions of normal broad-gauge rolling stock were constructed with compartment interiors.

The first of these were 7NBB, 8NBB and 1NABAB entering service in 1906. These carriages had identical external dimensions. The second-class NBB carriages were split into five equal compartments each seating eight passengers across two benches for a total capacity of 40 second-class passengers, with the outermost compartment at one end for smoking passengers and at the other for ladies. The NABAB carriage featured three compartments either side of a pair of central lavatory compartments for female passengers. The outer compartment at each end of the NABAB sat eight smoking passengers, while the inner two compartments either side sat four each. for a total of 16 first and 16 second class passengers. All of these vehicles were allocated to the Gembrook line.

In 1907 9NBB and 2NABAB were built and followed their classmates to the Gembrook line.

The full brakevan design was introduced in 1909 with 1NDD, built at Newport Workshops. It had the short wheelbase of the earlier NBDBD vans, but were otherwise designed similarly to the newer compartment style carriages including the extra  height. The type was aimed primarily at goods trains, as traffic had grown to the point that mixed trains were no longer justified. As such, it did not feature any passenger capacity, end-of-carriage doorways or a booking office area. It was constructed along with 3NABAB, 4NABAB for use on the Walhalla Line.

Under the 1910 recoding scheme, the NBBs of both types reclassed as NB, the NABAB to NAB, and 1NDD was recoded to 1NC. That year also saw 10NB constructed.

In 1911 the Colac to Beech Forest line was extended to Crowes, and in 1912 cars 11–14NB and van 2NC was constructed to reflect both that and increased traffic elsewhere on the system. These were followed in 1914 by cars 15–17NB and vans 3, 4 and 5NC, then 18–23NB in 1915 and 6NC in 1919. Much like 5NBC, when 5NC was rostered to the Crowes line it had a stove fitted.

1917 saw 4NAB relettered as pure second class and recoded 24NB; the other three vehicles followed in 1923, with 1NAB through 3NAB becoming 25–27NB.

Automatic couplers were fitted in lieu of the original Chopper style progressively between 1926 and 1928.

The NB cars were withdrawn in four batches. 1938 saw the loss of 8, 15 and 16NB, followed by 9, 11, 13 and 17–22 inclusive in 1949. 7, 10 and 14 were withdrawn in 1951, and the last pair, 12 and 23, in 1955.

25NB, formerly 1NAB, was scrapped in 1940, followed by 27NB ex 3NAB in 1951. Both 24NB and 26NB were recorded as scrapped in 1954 with the bodies recycled, but the latter "returned to register" in 1957. 1NC was scrapped in 1954, followed by 4NC in 1957. 6 was officially scrapped in 1955, but the body has since been recovered by Puffing Billy. 2, 3 and 5NC do not have recorded scrapping dates. Of these, 2NC had been recommended for scrapping at Wangaratta in November 1953, but instead it was overhauled at Newport Workshops then transferred to Colac. The other two units, 3 and 5NC, remained in Victorian Railways service until transferred to the Emerald Tourist Railway Board.

Puffing Billy Railway currently has former NABABs 2 and 4 in service as 26NAC and 24NB respectively, along with vans 2NC and 5NC. The Railway also has 3NC, 6NC, 8NB and 14NB awaiting restoration. 3NC was notable as one of the original Puffing Billy Preservation Society vehicles.

NQR open trucks in holiday traffic
Following the first world war traffic on the Upper Ferntree Gully to Gembrook line increased drastically, and the Victorian Railways were ill-prepared to manage this. As a short-term solution some of the NQR open trucks were fitted with seats and removable frameworks supporting canvas roofs and curtains, and trucks NQR 114 and 140 were identified as having screw-type hand brakes fitted in addition to normal air brakes, permitting their use in lieu of brake vans—but only in the city-bound direction, and only for holiday traffic. Notably, this modification is not reflected in the Rolling Stock Register for either truck. Both were recorded as sold privately in 1954.

Five more NQRs, numbered 219–223, were built between 1990 and 1992 by the Puffing Billy Railway, initially for passenger use and fitted with modified removable shelter frames.

NBH holiday stock

As a longer-term answer to the increased traffic on the Gembrook Line, in 1918 six NQR trucks (31, 33, 36, 38, 39 and 46) were withdrawn from service, stripped to the underframe and rebuilt into the first of the NBH passenger carriages, numbered 1 through 6 respectively and used for excursion-class passenger holiday traffic between April and May 1919. When they re-entered service they featured two single side doors on each side, a longitudinal central bench arrangement, air brakes but no hand brakes, and only a single cross-bar along the sides. 41 days after entering service a lower bar was fitted to the sides, after the Railways accepted that passengers were going to sit on the window sills no matter what the official position was. Following the broad-gauge tradition the "H" suffix indicated that the cars were only to be used for excursion traffic as required, because their accommodation was not of the same standard that regular passengers would have expected.

Later in 1919, a further nine NBH vehicles were constructed, and these entered service as 7–15NBH on 8 December that year.

These vehicles all shared the standard goods vehicle underframe design, including bogie spacing. They were rated to carry 32 passengers each.

The carriages were exclusively used between Upper Ferntree Gully and Gembrook until 1958, when the remaining 8 NBHs (3–4, 6–7, 9–11 & 13) were transferred to Colac for Australian Railway Historical Society trips on the Beech Forest line until its closure 1962.

The NBH carriages slowly fell into disuse from the 1930s and some were written off, with 1, 5 and 15 known to have been officially scrapped. However, in the early preservation era the Puffing Billy Preservation Society was forbidden by the Victorian Railways to introduce new vehicles to the fleet, so over time the condemned NBH carriages were "restored" and entered service.

Puffing Billy Railway
Under the Puffing Billy Preservation Society and later the Emerald Tourist Railway Board's management, the fleet of the Belgrave to Gembrook line has increased significantly from when the Victorian Railways was in control.

NBH
The remaining four first-series NBH vehicles, and the "restored" 1 and 5NBH, have had hand-brakes fitted. 8NBH has been restored to as near as possible to its original condition, with individual tongue and groove boards, canvas blinds, unpadded seating and full-length running boards. All the other original remaining vehicles have had thick padding added to the seats, and their canvas window blinds replaced with vinyl blinds with clear panels built in. All of the vehicles (besides 8NBH) have also had their tongue-and-groove timber ends and sides replaced with plywood sheets including simulated v-joints for additional strength and ease of construction. The capacity of each carriage has also been reduced from 32 to 28 adult passengers, addressing comfort levels.

A few NBH vehicles also had fixed perspex panels fitted in lieu of the blinds to provide shelter and prevent people sitting on the handrails over a few winters, but this proved unpopular with the public and the experiment has not been repeated.

In 1981 two new vehicles were built to the original NBH design, as the 250th and 251st vehicles to use the standard narrow-gauge underframe design. These entered service as 16NBH and 17NBH.

1997 to 1998 saw a further six units added to the fleet, with steel body frames in lieu of timber and with wider windowsills but otherwise to the same design. 18NBH entered traffic on 19/4/1997; 19NBH on 5/12/1997; 20NBH on 19/12/1997, with the others added in 1998.

NBHC conversions
As many of the original NBC and NC guards vans were scrapped by the Victorian Railways, Puffing Billy needed to organise additional vehicles with guard's accommodation. To accomplish this, three NBH vehicles were converted—originally intended to be temporary—from their original designs, with the short section between a door and the end of the vehicle fitted with a handbrake, windows and a partition to act as a guard's compartment. The three vehicles are now 11, 21 and 22NBHC. 21 and 22NBHC had double doors fitted in one end to provide for wheelchair access.

Use of the NBHC cars in trains also removes the weight of a full-length guards van from each train, permitting additional passenger capacity within the length and weight limits and reduces turn-around time at each end of the line, obviating the need for the guard van to be shunted to the opposite end of the train but removing the visual aspect of a traditional-looking van in the rear.

With the addition of the guard's compartment, a C was added to the end of the classification to identify its use as a brakevan, whereas traditional Victorian Railways coding would have the C before the H, making it NBCH.

Extended NBH

At the same time as 16NBH and 17NBH entered service, a new experimental design of extended NBH was constructed. Identified as 51NBH, this vehicle had double-doors at both ends and fold-up seats, providing capacity for up to three wheelchairs at each end. The vehicle length is the same as the compartment-style NAB/NB carriages.

A second extended NBH, number 52, entered service in 1983.

While the cars were successful, they increased the carriage weight by a seventh and decreased capacity from 28 to 24 passengers.

In the 2010s, the Puffing Billy Railway began investigating options for increasing its passenger fleet to cater for increased tourist traffic, with an interest expressed in twelve additional carriages. This would be enough to form an extra block train, above the maximum four trains in service on the busiest days each year at present.

Various designs were considered with lengths between the original design and a conceptual 11-metre carriage seating 42 passengers, but the decision was made to construct the new carriages to the same length as the previous extended NBH units 51 and 52. The new carriages will be constructed with steel frames similar to 18–23NBH. The new fleet will enter service as eight regular extended NBH cars 24–31 (instead of, say, 53–59), and four NBHC vehicles featuring an enclosed guard's compartment with three rear windows similar to those in the NC vans, and capacity for up to 24 passengers, or 12 plus six wheelchairs, numbered 1–4NBHC.

The first new carriage frame was transferred from Belgrave to Emerald for panelling and fit-out on 11 December 2017.

26NAC
Along with the NBH to NBHC conversions, carriage 26NB (formerly 2NAB) was restored as 26NAC, with the centre toilets removed and replaced with seating capacity, but one of the end compartments replaced with a guard's compartment.

2NC
During 2NC's restoration it was fitted with extra seating capacity for staff members, or passengers only if absolutely necessary.

NAL/NBL and NBD
Four end-platform, "O" class carriages were built in the period 1901–1902 for the Tasmanian Mt. Lyell Mining & Railway Company's 3'6" gauge railway. When that line closed in 1965, O1 was acquired by Puffing Billy for testing and, when this proved successful, the remaining carriages were imported. The first unit was reclassed 1NBL and the others followed, with the "L" reflecting their Mt. Lyell origin and perhaps a reference to the deluxe carriages Pioneer and Enterprise, later classed BL.

1NBL was originally painted cream and red and used as its VIP carriage for special occasions, while the other vehicles were restored for regular use and painted all-over red.

When the Railway embarked on its Luncheon Train and Night Train services, the NBL cars were fitted with upgraded seating and gates in the end-platform railings, reclassed as NAL to reflect their first-class use and repainted in red with ornate gold lining. The cars were named after stations on the Mt. Lyell line, 1 through 4 respectively as Mt. Lyell, Teepookana, Rinadeena, and Dubbil Barril.

1NB (saloon type) was restored in the early 2000s to reflect its configuration of about 1910. After it re-entered service in December 2005, its classmate 5NBD, which in 1974 had been modified with a guard's compartment installed as well as carpet and a 2+1 seating arrangement, was refitted as a temporary catering car for use on the Lunch and Dinner services in conjunction with the NAL carriages.

The 2+1 cross-bench seats were removed and replaced with food preparation equipment.

Prior to the use of 5NBD as the catering car, the Luncheon train consist generally ran with 2NBC at the Belgrave end.

Walhalla Goldfields Railway
As the Walhalla Goldfields Railway was re-opened long after Puffing Billy was established, rolling stock available for restoration was difficult to acquire. To overcome this, the railway constructed a new batch of narrow gauge vehicles based on the Victorian Railways designs and coded similarly, but with a "W" suffix. The vehicles were constructed on underframes recycled from coal wagons previously operated by the State Electricity Commission of Victoria, so they are longer and wider than the equivalent Puffing Billy vehicles.

NBW
Two NBW carriages exist, approximating a wider, stretched version of the NBB/NB saloon type carriages with end platforms. Each seats 36 passengers.

NBCW
A single guards van was built for the Walhalla Goldfields Railway, featuring a 16-seat saloon area and a guards van similar to the layout of the NBDBD/NBC vans.

NQRW
One wagon was fitted out with a framework for supporting a temporary roof, similar to the original sheltered NQR design. In 2016 the wagon was remodelled and fitted with end-of-train equipment, allowing it to be substituted for the NBCW when necessary.

Railmotors
The Walhalla Goldfields Railway has also acquired two former X1-class trams. In the short term, X1 461 is planned to be converted to function as a diesel-powered railmotor with capacity for 28 passengers and one wheelchair, and eventually, X1 463 may be converted into a trailing unit.

References

 Narrow Gauge Rolling Stock
 Narrow Gauge Stock
 Puffing Billy Railway Rolling Stock

Rolling stock of Victoria (Australia)